The 1938–39 New York Americans season was the Americans' 14th season of play.

Offseason

Regular season

Final standings

Record vs. opponents

Game log

Playoffs
They went against Toronto in the first round in a best of three series and got swept in 2 games, or 0–2.

Player stats

Regular season
Scoring

Goaltending

Playoffs
Scoring

Goaltending

Awards and records

Transactions

See also
1938–39 NHL season

References

New York Americans seasons
New York Americans
New York Americans
New York Amer
New York Amer
1930s in Manhattan
Madison Square Garden